A centered dodecahedral number is a centered figurate number that represents a dodecahedron. The centered dodecahedral number for a specific n is given by

The first such numbers are 1, 33, 155, 427, 909, 1661, 2743, 4215, 6137, 8569, … .

Congruence Relations
 
 
 

Figurate numbers